The 2013–14 NBL season is the 32nd season for the Adelaide 36ers in the Australasian based National Basketball League. In 2012–13, the 36ers missed out on the playoffs for the 6th time in the past 7 seasons, finishing the season with the club's third wooden spoon (the third in four years) with a record equalling worst ever 8-20 record. The Adelaide 36ers have won the NBL championship four times (1986, 1998, 1998–99 and 2001–02), earning Adelaide the nickname of "Title Town".

The 36ers have played their home games at the 8,000 seat Adelaide Arena since 1992. The arena is the largest purpose built basketball venue in Australia and the fifth largest venue currently used in the NBL behind the Perth Arena (14,846 - set at 13,000 for regular season NBL games), the Sydney Entertainment Centre (10,517), Hisense Arena in Melbourne (10,500) and the Vector Arena (9,300) in Auckland. Along with the North Shore Events Centre (Auckland) which also opened in 1992, the Adelaide Arena is also the second oldest venue currently used by the NBL, with the Sydney Entertainment Centre the oldest having opened in 1983.

After three disappointing seasons under former Australian Institute of Sport (AIS) coach Marty Clarke which saw the club finish second last, last, and last again, the 36ers signed former Brisbane Bullets NBL championship winning coach Joey Wright as its head coach for 2013–14. Former 36ers championship player and 1998 NBL Grand Final MVP Kevin Brooks has re-joined the team as assistant coach.

Off-season

Additions
(From the squad at the end of the 2012–13 NBL season)

* Jarrid Frye was released by the 36ers on 12 February 2014.* Rhys Carter signed on 12 February following Frye's release.

Subtractions
(From the squad at the end of the 2012–13 NBL season)

Current roster

Depth chart

2013–14 NBL clubs
 
 
 
 
 
 
 
 

* The Melbourne Tigers and New Zealand Breakers use two home venues each during the season, with finals games (if they qualify) to be played at the larger Hisense and Vector Arena's respectively (subject to venue availability).

Regular season

Ladder

Game log

Regular season
 Games with a * are televised on One HD. Games with ** are on Network Ten. Games with *** shown on Sky Sport NZ (games in NZ are not televised in Australia unless finals). All games are broadcast live online through NBL.TV

|- style="background-color:#ffcccc;"
| 1*
| 11 October
| @ Wildcats
| L 80-83
| Daniel Johnson (28)
| Anthony Petrie (10)
| Gary Ervin (7)
| Perth Arena10,208
| 0-1
|- style="background-color:#bbffbb;"
| 2
| 19 October
| Hawks
| W 97-91
| Gary Ervin (24)
| Daniel Johnson (9)
| Adam Gibson (7)
| Adelaide Arena5,815
| 1-1
|- style="background-color:#bbffbb;"
| 3*
| 25 October
| @ Taipans
| W 87-84
| Mitch Creek (14)
| Jarrid Frye,Anthony Petrie (7)
| Jarrid Frye (3)
| Cairns Convention Centre3,703
| 2-1
|- style="background-color:#ffcccc;"
| 4
| 27 October
| @ Tigers
| L 93-79
| Daniel Johnson (20)
| Anthony Petrie (12)
| Adam Gibson (3)
| State Netball and Hockey Centre3,236
| 2-2
|- style="background-color:#bbffbb;"
| 5***
| 31 October
| @ Breakers
| W 96-93
| Gary Ervin (22)
| Anthony Petrie (6)
| Gary Ervin (6)
| North Shore Events Centre3,175
| 3-2

|- style="background-color:#bbffbb;"
| 6**
| 3 November
| Kings
| W 97-84
| Daniel Johnson (20)
| Mitch Creek (10)
| Gary Ervin (7)
| Adelaide Arena4,540
| 4-2
|- style="background-color:#bbffbb;"
| 7
| 8 November
| Tigers
| W 90-87
| Gary Ervin (21)
| Luke Schenscher (7)
| Gary Ervin (8)
| Adelaide Arena4,364
| 5-2
|- style="background-color:#bbffbb;"
| 8***
| 15 November
| @ Breakers
| W 95-94
| Gary Ervin (26)
| Daniel Johnson (9)
| Adam Gibson, Gary Ervin (6)
| Vector Arena7,470
| 6-2
|- style="background-color:#bbffbb;"
| 9*
| 22 November
| Wildcats
| W 91-86
| Daniel Johnson (24)
| Anthony Petrie (8)
| Jason Cadee (5)
| Adelaide Arena6,585
| 7-2
|- style="background-color:#bbffbb;"
| 10*
| 29 November
| Hawks
| W 82-81
| Gary Ervin,  Daniel Johnson (16)
| Daniel Johnson (12)
| Adam Gibson (6)
| Adelaide Arena4,080
| 8-2

|- style="background-color:#ffcccc;"
| 11
| 6 December
| @ Crocodiles
| L 94-98
| Gary Ervin (22)
| Anthony Petrie (8)
| Adam Gibson (5)
| Townsville Entertainment Centre2,909
| 8-3
|- style="background-color:#ffcccc;"
| 12
| 7 December
| @ Taipans
| L 78-98
| Adam Gibson (20)
| B.J. Anthony (8)
| Adam Gibson,  Gary Ervin,  Jarrid Frye (2)
| Cairns Convention Centre3,750
| 8-4
|- style="background-color:#bbffbb;"
| 13**
| 15 December
| Taipans
| W 91-67
| Daniel Johnson (21)
| Luke Schenscher (9)
| Adam Gibson (9)
| Adelaide Arena4,981
| 9-4
|- style="background-color:#bbffbb;"
| 14
| 31 December
| @ Crocodiles
| W 90-89
| Daniel Johnson (20)
| Daniel Johnson (9)
| Jason Cadee (6)
| Townsville Entertainment Centre3,920
| 10-4

|- style="background-color:#bbffbb;"
| 15
| 4 January
| Breakers
| W 99-73
| Daniel Johnson (26)
| Anthony Petrie (13)
| Adam Gibson (7)
| Adelaide Arena6,676
| 11-4
|- style="background-color:#ffcccc;"
| 16**
| 12 January
| Kings
| L 89-102
| Daniel Johnson (21)
| Adam Gibson (6)
| Jason Cadee (5)
| Adelaide Arena6,314
| 11-5
|- style="background-color:#bbffbb;"
| 17**
| 18 January
| Crocodiles
| W 92-79
| Adam Gibson (28)
| Luke Schenscher (12)
| Gary Ervin (8)
| Adelaide Arena5,737
| 12-5
|- style="background-color:#ffcccc;"
| 18**
| 26 January
| @ Kings
| L 93-105
| Daniel Johnson (28)
| Daniel Johnson (8)
| Gary Ervin (6)
| Sydney Entertainment Centre3,622
| 12-6

|- style="background-color:#bbffbb;"
| 19
| 1 February
| Taipans
| W 89-87
| Daniel Johnson (33)
| Daniel Johnson (8)
| Adam Gibson (8)
| Adelaide Arena5,519
| 13-6
|- style="background-color:#ffcccc;"
| 20**
| 9 February
| @ Hawks
| L 80-102
| Adam Gibson (21)
| Mitch Creek (10)
| Jarrid Frye (2)
| WIN Entertainment Centre1,840
| 13-7
|- style="background-color:#ffcccc;"
| 21*
| 14 February
| @ Wildcats
| L 61-85
| Anthony Petrie (15)
| Adam Gibson (5)
| Adam Gibson (5)
| Perth Arena11,473
| 13-8
|- style="background-color:#bbffbb;"
| 22**
| 16 February
| @ Tigers
| W 99-82
| Gary Ervin (25)
| Daniel Johnson (11)
| Gary Ervin (8)
| Hisense Arena6,704
| 14-8
|- style="background-color:#bbffbb;"
| 23**
| 23 February
| Breakers
| W 96-92
| Daniel Johnson (28)
| Daniel Johnson,Adam Gibson (7)
| Adam Gibson (11)
| Adelaide Arena6,011
| 15-8
|- style="background-color:#ffcccc;"
| 24*
| 28 February
| @ Hawks
| L 89-91
| Gary Ervin (21)
| Daniel Johnson (12)
| Gary Ervin (4)
| WIN Entertainment Centre3,123
| 15-9

|- style="background-color:#bbffbb;"
| 25
| 8 March
| Crocodiles
| W 102-70
| Gary Ervin (20)
| Luke Schenscher (10)
| Mitch Creek (5)
| Adelaide Arena5,722
| 16-9
|- style="background-color:#bbffbb;"
| 26*
| 14 March
| Wildcats
| W 102-79
| Daniel Johnson (19)
| Luke Schenscher (11)
| Gary Ervin (7)
| Adelaide Arena6,253
| 17-9
|- style="background-color:#ffcccc;"
| 27**
| 16 March
| @ Kings
| L 90-100
| Daniel Johnson (23)
| Luke Schenscher (7)
| Jason Cadee (3)
| Sydney Entertainment Centre3,746
| 17-10
|- style="background-color:#bbffbb;"
| 28**
| 23 March
| Tigers
| W 99-94
| Daniel Johnson (25)
| Luke Schenscher (9)
| Jason Cadee (8)
| Adelaide Arena5,843
| 18-10

Finals
Game 3 only if required

|- style="background-color:#bbffbb;"
| SF1*
| 27 March
| Tigers
| W 101-85
| Gary Ervin (27)
| Luke Schenscher, Daniel Johnson (7)
| Gary Ervin (7)
| Adelaide Arena3,865
| 1-0
|- style="background-color:#ffcccc;"
| SF2*
| 30 March
| @ Tigers
| L 87-98
| Brendan Teys, Anthony Petrie (17)
| Daniel Johnson (12)
| Adam Gibson (3)
| Hisense Arena4,044
| 1-1
|- style="background-color:#bbffbb;"
| SF3*
| 1 April
| Tigers
| W 102-63
| Daniel Johnson (23)
| Adam Gibson (8)
| Jason Cadee (4)
| Adelaide Arena4,024
| 2-1

|- style="background-color:#ffcccc;"
| GF1*
| 7 April
| @ Wildcats
| L 85-92
| Daniel Johnson (18)
| Daniel Johnson (8)
| Adam Gibson (9)
| Perth Arena13,291
| 0-1
|- style="background-color:#bbffbb;"
| GF2*
| 11 April
| Wildcats
| W 89-84
| Gary Ervin (23)
| Adam Gibson (9)
| Adam Gibson (7)
| Adelaide Arena8,127
| 1-1
|- style="background-color:#"
| GF3*
| 13 April
| @ Wildcats
| TBD
| TBD
| TBD
| TBD
| Perth ArenaTBD
| TBD

Player statistics

Regular season 

* Jarrid Frye was released on 12 February 2014

Finals

Awards

Player of the Month

Coach of the Month
November - Joey Wright

NBL Award Winners
All-NBL First team: Daniel Johnson (Power forward)

Season summary

Regular season
The addition of 2007 NBL Championship winning coach Joey Wright and a new assistant coach in former 36ers championship player Kevin Brooks, had a marked effect on the Adelaide 36ers. Along with former NBL Most Valuable Player Gary Ervin who joined the team from Townsville, and small forward Jarrid Frye (who was cut due to injuries two-thirds of the way through the season and was replaced with former 36er Rhys Carter), they helped turn the 36ers fortunes around with what was almost the same team that had finished last in 2012-13.

The Adelaide 36ers finished the regular season in second place behind the Perth Wildcats with an 18-10 record. 6'11" (212 cm) centre Daniel Johnson led the 36ers in scoring with 19.5 points per game for the season (up from 16.2 ppg in 2012-13) which was good enough for fifth best in the league. Johnson also led the team in rebounding (7.0 pg) which was also good enough for 5th in the league. This however was down on his league leading 8.0 rebounds per game in 2012-13. Team captain Adam Gibson and Gary Ervin finished second and third respectively in league assists per game with 4.7 and 4.6 respectively.

Adelaide's change in fortunes, after finishing three of the previous four seasons in last place, including in 2011-12 and 2012–13, was shown when it won both of its season series against the 2012-13 Grand Final teams, defending champions New Zealand, and the Perth Wildcats. The 36ers defeated the Breakers 4-0 in their series, including the team's first win in Auckland for 5 years, and tied the series 2-2 with Perth, but won the series by outscoring the Wildcats 334-333 over the four games. However, with Perth winning the regular season with a 21-7 record they would have home court advantage throughout the finals.

NBL Finals

Semi-finals
The Adelaide 36ers were matched against the third placed Melbourne Tigers for their semi-final series. Adelaide won the season series 3-1 over the Tigers and had home court advantage for the semis. Game 1 of the series went to the 36ers 101-85, giving them their first finals victory since 2006. Game two at the Hisense Arena in Melbourne was shrouded in controversy. The NBL's leading points scorer, Tigers shooting guard Chris Goulding exploded after a quiet game 1 and scored 37 points to help keep the Tigers from being eliminated with a 98-87 win. Near the end of the fourth period, Gary Ervin kneed Goulding in the groin, with the Tigers player falling in a heap on the court. For his actions Ervin was suspended for one game by the NBL (meaning he would miss the crucial Game 3 in Adelaide). He was also fined 7,500.

With Ervin out, the Tigers were expected to push the 36ers in Game 3 despite not having won at the Adelaide Arena during the season. The 36ers, led by 23 points from Daniel Johnson and 19 points in a return to form by Jason Cadee, with club captain Adam Gibson keeping Goulding out of the game. Goulding, who was loudly booed by the 36ers crowd whenever he touched the ball, and for his blatant 'flop' in the 3rd when he ran into former Gold Coast Blaze teammate Anthony Petrie, was restricted to just 6 points on just 1/5 shooting as Adelaide routed the Tigers 102-63 to win their way into the club's first Grand Final series since their 2001-02 championship win.

Grand final
The Adelaide 36ers will play the Perth Wildcats in the NBL Grand Final after the Wildcats swept their semi-final series with the Wollongong Hawks for the second straight year. After playing semi-finals against each other in 1987, 1991, 1995 and 1999/2000 (all won by Perth), the 36ers and Wildcats, the two most successful clubs in NBL history with 9 championships between them, play each other in their first Grand Final series.

Adelaide 36ers Awards
 Most Valuable Player (Mark Davis Trophy): Daniel Johnson
 Best Team Mate (formerly Players' Player): Anthony Petrie
 Most Improved Player: Brendan Teys
 Best Defensive Player: Adam Gibson
 Best Club Person: TBA

See also
2013–14 NBL season
2014 NBL Finals

References

External links 
 Official website of the Adelaide 36ers

Adelaide 36ers seasons
Adelaide